Luis Barraza (born November 8, 1996) is an American professional soccer player who plays as a goalkeeper for Major League Soccer club New York City FC.

Club career
Born in Las Cruces, New Mexico, Barraza is of Mexican descent and spent his early career with the Real Salt Lake Arizona academy. He then enrolled at Marquette University where he represented the Marquette Golden Eagles from 2015 to 2018.

Whilst at college, Barraza also played in the USL League Two with Lane United FC, FC Tucson and Chicago FC United.

On January 11, 2019, Barraza was selected with the 12th overall pick at the 2019 MLS SuperDraft by New York City FC. He then signed a professional contract with the side on January 28, 2019. On December 15, 2020, almost two years since signing his professional deal, Barraza made his professional debut for New York City in a 4-0 loss against Tigres UANL in the CONCACAF Champions League.

On May 31, 2021, Barraza moved to USL Championship side Oakland Roots on loan.

International career
Born in the United States to Mexican parents, Barraza holds a U.S. and Mexican citizenship, which makes him eligible to represent either the United States or Mexico.

Career statistics

Club

Honors
New York City FC
MLS Cup: 2021
Campeones Cup: 2022

References

External links
Profile at the New York City FC website

1996 births
Living people
People from Las Cruces, New Mexico
American soccer players
American sportspeople of Mexican descent
Association football goalkeepers
Marquette Golden Eagles men's soccer players
Lane United FC players
FC Tucson players
Chicago FC United players
New York City FC players
Oakland Roots SC players
Soccer players from New Mexico
USL League Two players
New York City FC draft picks
USL Championship players
Major League Soccer players
MLS Next Pro players
New York City FC II players